Mycosphaerella citri is a fungal plant pathogen infecting citruses.

See also
 List of citrus diseases
 List of Mycosphaerella species

References

citri
Fungal citrus diseases
Fungi described in 1972